Chicago International Produce Market (or CIPM) is a wholesale produce market in Chicago, Illinois. It is the largest facility of its kind in the midwestern United States.

Location
The market is located on the near southwest side of Chicago, just north of the South Branch of the Chicago River, between Chicago's Pilsen and McKinley Park neighborhoods. It consists of a single building on a  site. There are two entrances: one from the west on Damen Avenue, and one from the north near Blue Island Avenue. Traffic moves counterclockwise around the main building. The western side of the building is used for receiving, while the eastern side is used for loading.

CIPM is a focal point of food wholesale in Chicago, and several other food wholesalers are located within a mile radius.

History
By the late 20th century, South Water Market had unacceptable congestion and inadequate space. On 10 July 2003, the Chicago Planning Commission granted its approval for the new site. It is being developed by CenterPoint Properties. It was designed by Cornerstone Architects Ltd., Itasca, Illinois.

Similar Markets
 Hunts Point Cooperative Market

External links
 http://www.chicagoproducemarket.com/index.html

Food markets in the United States
Companies based in Chicago